Al Marmoom Ultramarathon also known as AMUM is an annual series of desert endurance races hosted by Al Marmoom Desert Conservation Reserve in Dubai, United Arab Emirates since 2018. Al Marmoom Ultramarathon is regarded as the world's longest desert ultramarathon.

Venue 
Al Marmoom Desert Conservation Reserve was launched in 2018 under the initiative of UAE Vice President and Prime Minister and Ruler of Dubai Sheikh Mohammed bin Rashid Al Maktoum.

The first unfenced desert conservation reserve in the country. The reserve spans 10% of the emirate of Dubai's total area.

The Al Marmoom Reserve, the largest sustainable environment, tourism and recreational project in the United Arab Emirates.

Al Marmoom Desert Conservation Reserve is managed by Dubai Municipality.

History 
The Al Marmoom desert ultra-race was first held in 2018 as the world's longest desert race. Organized under the umbrella of Dubai Sports Council, AMUM was created to support Al Marmoom Desert Conservation Reserve's commitment to desert sports and tourism destinations and wildlife conservation preserves.

AMUM 2022 
In February 2022 Al Marmoom Ultramarathon, the world's longest desert ultramarathon series presented by First Abu Dhabi Bank (FAB) staged a 50KM desert ultra-race in celebration of the United Arab Emirates (UAE's) Golden Jubilee. It also organized a 5KM dune run for the community and both races took place at the Expo 2020 Dubai Lake. The 2022 race included the participation of some of the world's fastest desert endurance runners and also ultra-runners from across the region who took on the tough challenge. At the end of the race, the contestants participated in planting 120 Ghaf trees around the Expo 2020 Dubai Lake, to contribute to leaving a lasting legacy.

Winners

270km Series

100km Series

50km Series

10km Series

5km Series

Notes

External links 
 

Nature conservation in the United Arab Emirates
2018 establishments in the United Arab Emirates
Recurring sporting events established in 2018
Marathons in the United Arab Emirates
Long-distance running competitions
Sport in the Emirate of Dubai
Sports competitions in Dubai